The 2019 NBL Finals were the championship series of the 2018–19 NBL season and the conclusion of the season. The semi-finals started on 28 February and ended 3 March 2019, making way for the Grand Final series to commence on 8 March and end on 17 March 2018. The Perth Wildcats were 3-1 victors over Melbourne United in the best of 5 series, winning their ninth NBL championship title.

Format 
The finals were played in February and March 2020 between the top four teams of the regular season, consisting of two best-of-three semi-final and one best-of-five final series, where the higher seed hosts the first, third and fifth games.

Qualification

Qualified teams

Ladder

Seedings 

 Perth Wildcats
 Melbourne United
 Sydney Kings
 Brisbane Bullets

The NBL tie-breaker system as outlined in the NBL Rules and Regulations states that in the case of an identical win–loss record, the overall points percentage will determine order of seeding.

Playoff bracket

Semi-Finals Series

(2) Melbourne United vs. (3) Sydney Kings

(1) Perth Wildcats vs. (4) Brisbane Bullets

Grand Final Series

(1) Perth Wildcats vs. (2) Melbourne United

References 

2018–19 NBL season
National Basketball League (Australia) Finals